Târgu Ocna is a town in Bacău County, Romania, situated on the left bank of the Trotuș River, an affluent of the Siret, and on a branch railway which crosses the Ghimeș Pass from Moldavia into Transylvania. Târgu Ocna is built among the Carpathian Mountains on bare hills formed of rock salt. In fact the English translation of Ocna is salt mine.

Târgu Ocna's main industry is salt production, as it is the largest provider in Moldavia. Other industries include wood processing, coal mining, steel producing, and petroleum-based industries.

The town administers two villages, Poieni and Vâlcele.

People
 Gabriela Adameșteanu (born 1942), writer
 Sorin Antohi (born 1957), political scientist
 Miron Grindea (1909–1995), journalist
 Dan Iuga (born 1945), pistol shooter
 Costache Negri (1812–1876), writer
 Mihăiță Nițulescu  ( 1969–2022), boxer
 Ion Talianu (1898–1956), actor
 Traian Vasai (born 1929), painter

References

Populated places in Bacău County
Localities in Western Moldavia
Towns in Romania
Mining communities in Romania
Market towns in Moldavia
Spa towns in Romania